Proleptolepis is an extinct genus of ray-finned fish belonging to the family Leptolepidae.

See also
 List of prehistoric bony fish genera

References

Prehistoric ray-finned fish genera